Akşit is a Turkish surname. Notable people with the surname include:

 Baha Akşit (1914–1995), Turkish physician
 Cihangir Akşit, Turkish major general and NATO official
 Güldal Akşit (born 1960), Turkish politician

Turkish-language surnames